Italy competed at the 2021 World Athletics Relays in Silesia, Poland, from 1 to 2 May 2021.

Medalists

Selected athletes
30 athletes, 14 men and 16 women, was selected for the event.

Men

4x100
Marcell Jacobs
Davide Manenti
Federico Cattaneo
Eseosa Desalu
Filippo Tortu
Antonio Infantino
Roberto Rigali

4x400/4x400 mixed
Davide Re (cap.)
Vladimir Aceti
Edoardo Scotti
Alessandro Sibilio
Brayan Lopez
Lorenzo Benati
Mattia Cesarico

Women

4x100
Irene Siragusa
Anna Bongiorni
Johanelis Herrera Abreu
Gloria Hooper (cap.)
Vittoria Fontana
Dalia Kaddari
Chiara Melon

4x400/4x400 mixed
Maria Benedicta Chigbolu
Ayomide Folorunso
Raphaela Lukudo
Giancarla Trevisan
Alice Mangione
Rebecca Borga
Eleonora Marchiando
Virginia Troiani
Petra Nardelli

Results

In the heats all five teams qualified for the final, the three who did not yet have the Olympic pass (Men's 4x100 m, Woman 4x400 m and Mixed 4x400 m), got it.

Men

Women

Mixed

See also
Italian national track relay team

References

External links
 Silesia 21 at World Athletics
 The 28 Italian athletes biographies at Italian Athletics Federation 

2021
2021 World Athletics Relays
World Athletics Relays